Finswimming in the United Kingdom (UK) is practised at both regional and national level via a network of clubs affiliated to a national body, the British Finswimming Association (BFA).

Governance

British Finswimming Association 
The BFA is considered by proponents of finswimming being as the National Governing Body for Finswimming in the United Kingdom.  However, as of November 2013, the British government recognises the British Sub-Aqua Club (BSAC) as being the National Governing Body responsible for this sport.

The BFA was formed in 1999 following the creation of the British Underwater Sports Association in 1998 as a body to represent British underwater sports to the Confédération Mondiale des Activités Subaquatiques (CMAS) following the expulsion of the BSAC as the CMAS affiliate for the UK.
BFA's membership of the BUSA entitles it to compete in international competitions conducted under the auspices of CMAS.
The BFA is club-based organisation managed on a day-to-day basis by an executive committee.  Its services include the provision of public liability insurance and access to a coaching program.

Clubs
As of April 2017, competition at a regional level within the UK is offered by the following clubs:

ASKA Club (Chester)
FinWorld Finswimming Club (London)  
Hampshire Spitfires (Hampshire) 
Neptune Finswimming Club (Bristol) 
Northern Lights Finswimming Club (Newcastle and North Tyneside) 
LondonFin Swimming and Finswimming Club (London)

Competitions

Regional
Regional competition is offered by the BFA club system.

National
There is an annual National Short Course (25 m pool) Finswimming Championships in the United Kingdom, which are traditionally held at the Edenbridge Leisure Centre, Edenbridge, Kent in November.  As of 2007, the annual National Long Course (50 m pool) Finswimming Championships have been held; the first being held in Aldershot, Hampshire.

International
British finswimmers compete at international level including events offered within Europe at both national and continental level, and events offered within the sporting framework associated with the Commonwealth of Nations.

See also

References

External links
 British Finswimming Association homepage
 Information resource about finswimming in the UK
 Cassandra at the "BFA Short Course and Student National Championship” 2011
 Finswimming Gala in Bristol, 7/12/2013

 
Finswimming